The 1986 United States Senate election in Idaho took place on November 4, 1986 alongside other elections to the United States Senate in other states as well as elections to the United States House of Representatives and various state and local elections. Incumbent Republican U.S. Senator Steve Symms narrowly won re-election to a second term. As of 2022, this remains the last time that a Senate election in Idaho has been decided by a single-digit margin.

Candidates

Democratic
 John V. Evans, Governor

Republican
 Steve Symms, incumbent U.S. Senator

Results

See also 
 1986 United States Senate elections

References 

Idaho
1986
1986 Idaho elections